A public viewing area is a space set aside for members of the public to safely view sites of interest, such as airports, railroads, construction sites or other facilities.  Sometimes they are known as visitor centers or interpretive sites.

In locations that have inherent dangers and would not normally be accessible to the public, viewing areas provide a way to satiate the public curiosity without exposing inordinate risk.  Many sites contain descriptive signs, viewing pavilions, picnic facilities, toilets, radio receivers and brochures.

Examples

Airports 
Austin-Bergstrom International Airport (KAUS), Family Viewing Area is located near the State Aircraft Pooling Board (fancy talk for where aircraft belonging to the State of Texas gets maintained and stored) at the end of Golf Course Road. and faces west to runway 17L/35R. The Family Viewing Area also has paved parking, grassy areas, a picnic table.
Baltimore–Washington International Airport (KBWI), has the Thomas A Dixon Jr Aircraft Observation Park located just to the south of Dorsey Road which is a viewing area complete with parking, picnic tables, trash cans, and a playground. The BWI Loop Trail also runs through the park.
Charlotte-Douglas International Airport (KCLT) in Charlotte, North Carolina has the Charlotte Airport Overlook which is located on the west side of the airport on Old Dowd Road, near the  threshold of 18C. It is also equipped with a large parking lot, benches and picnic tables.
Chicago Executive Airport (Palwaukee) (KPWK) in Wheeling, Illinois, has a public viewing area along Palatine Frontage Road that allows the public to view aircraft operations at the airport and provides seating, parking and airport information.  A speaker with Air Traffic Control radio operations allows visitors to hear the planes and control tower.
Dallas/Fort Worth International Airport (KDFW) has a public viewing area located at Founders Plaza. The 6-acre (2.4 ha) plaza features a granite monument and sculpture, post-mounted binoculars, piped-in voices of air traffic controllers and shade pavilions. In 2010, a memorial honoring Delta Air Lines Flight 191 was dedicated at the plaza.
Mitchell International Airport (KMKE) in Milwaukee, WI has a public viewing area located on the north edge of the airport along Layton Avenue providing parking and rebroadcast of ATC communications.
Aurora Municipal Airport (KARR) in Sugar Grove, Illinois has a picnic table next to the control tower where the public can safely view operations.
DeKalb Airport (KDKB) in DeKalb, Illinois has a viewing area set up at the east end of the hangar row.
McCarran International Airport (KLAS) in Paradise, Nevada (Las Vegas) has a viewing area along Sunset Road next to the longest two runways at the airport. Tower communications are available on FM radios.
Minneapolis-St. Paul International Airport (KMSP) has a viewing area located at the end of Cargo Road next to the FedEx Shipping Center where plane spotters can see aircraft land and take off from two different runways. Picnic tables, trash cans, and parking are provided.
Nashville International Airport (KBNA) in Nashville, TN has a viewing area off of Vultee Avenue, east of Briley Parkway (TN-155). Picnic tables, trash cans and parking are provided.
Palm Beach International Airport (KPBI) in Palm Beach, Florida has a viewing area in a small park on the south side of the field on Perimeter Rd, just east of the approach end of Runway 31. Picnic tables, trash cans and parking are provided.
Fort Lauderdale/Hollywood International Airport (KFLL) in Fort Lauderdale, Florida has three viewing areas. The Ron Gardner Aircraft Observation Area is on the south side of the approach end of Runway 10L, just east of the Animal Shelter. Picnic tables, trash cans and parking are provided. A loudspeaker monitors the tower. Another observation area is located on the top level of the Hibiscus Parking Garage. A third viewing area is just south of Runway 10R in the Airport Greenbelt Park.
Fort Lauderdale Executive Airport (KFXE) in Fort Lauderdale, Florida has a viewing area southwest of Runway 8. Picnic tables, trash cans, and parking are provided. A loudspeaker monitors the tower.
Hinckley Airport in Hinckley, Illinois has a picnic table along the grass strip for people to watch the aircraft operations and skydivers returning. The airport is used mostly for glider operations (Windy City Soaring) and skydiving, the skydivers (usually) return to a clearing just north of runway 9/27.
Rochelle Municipal Airport in Rochelle, Illinois hosts the Chicagoland Skydiving Center, and its ramp is open to the public for viewing. A bar and restaurant affords views of the operations. Aside from the skydiving operations (with airplanes and helicopters) other airport operations are easily viewed and photographed.
Glendale Municipal Airport in Glendale, Arizona has a $100 Hamburger restaurant overlooking the main apron and runway, this also has a patio outside where visitors can enjoy the weather, view the aircraft operations and have meals. When the restaurant is closed the patio remains open for seating.
Phoenix Deer Valley Airport in Phoenix, Arizona has a patio area facing the runways adjacent to the terminal building and a restaurant with a view of the runways. Radio receivers for the Ground Control and both Control Tower channels allow one to hear the radio traffic.
Manchester Airport in Manchester, England has had public viewing areas since the airport opened in 1938. The "Runway Visitor Park" not only allows viewing of aircraft movements, but also has a café, aviation souvenir shop, and several aircraft on display, including retired Concorde G-BOAC and others.
Scottsdale Municipal Airport in Scottsdale, Arizona has an outside patio with benches and control tower audio accessible thru the terminal building. While glass windows separate the ramp from the patio (making pictures difficult) and excellent view of the ramp and runway is afforded. Control Tower radio traffic is also heard in the terminal itself.
Raleigh Durham International Airport (KRDU) has Observation Park which provides sweeping views of RDU’s 10,000-foot runway and is located near the Air Traffic Control Tower. It has an elevated observation area, radios that play tower communications, and a picnic area. Free parking and restrooms are provided.
Van Nuys Airport has a public viewing center on the east side of the airport near the intersection of Woodley Ave. and Waterman Drive.

Railroads 
Rochelle, Illinois, has built a public viewing area at the crossing of the Union Pacific and BNSF railroads there, complete with an elevated shelter, parking lot, gift shop, toilet facilities and BBQ grills.  They pipe in railroad radio audio on 106.9 MHz so visitors can listen to the radio traffic on FM radios.  Trains magazine also sponsors a webcam to allow viewing of via the Internet.
Folkston, Georgia has a small but well-appointed viewing area, overlooking the "Folkston Funnel", a stretch of track where two CSX lines have combined for a large amount of rail traffic. The shelter itself has some chairs, rail radio broadcasts, ample parking and electrical outlets for charging camera batteries. The only amenity it lacks is a restroom, but there is a McDonald's within a block that is railfan friendly. Highlights of viewing include up to 60 trains a day, including the auto train and the Tropicana juice train.
Homewood, Illinois has built a public viewing platform at the south end of the CN (former Illinois Central) Markham Yard.  This location is on the east side of the tracks and is connected by a tunnel under the tracks to the Homewood Metra / Amtrak station.  Near the station is a static display of an IC GP10 and caboose.  There is a Starbucks coffee shop on the other side of Harwood Avenue from the viewing platform and there are several restaurants within an easy walk in downtown Homewood.

Locks and dams 
Many lock and dam facilities along the various rivers in the US have public viewing areas, including:

 Lock and Dam No. 15 in Rock Island, Illinois on the Mississippi River
 Olmsted Locks and Dam in Olmsted, Illinois on the Ohio River
 Lock and Dam No. 12  in Bellevue, Iowa on the Mississippi River
 Robert Moses Niagara Power Plant near Lewiston, New York, on the Niagara River, has an extensive interpretive center known as the Niagara Power Vista.
 Hoover Dam near Boulder City, Nevada, on the Colorado River, has an extremely large interpretive center and tour facility.
 Parker Dam near Parker, Arizona, on the Colorado River, has a basic viewing area with views of the dam and interpretive signs.

Construction sites 
These are, by necessity, often temporary in nature.  Harkening back to the "knotholes" in fences used by passersby to view the progress of a site, some large projects provide a glimpse into the construction by intentionally placing viewing ports in fences, often geared toward selling space in the final project.

Sports venues 
Some stadiums provide locations where the public can view games in progress without entering the stadium or paying for an admission. AT&T Park in San Francisco, California, home of the San Francisco Giants has such an area.

External links
 Bruce's Planespotting guide: https://web.archive.org/web/20080923210623/http://www.bruceleibowitz.net/spotting-guide.htm
 Airport Spotters Wiki: http://www.spotterswiki.com
 Homewood Viewing Platform: https://web.archive.org/web/20080509075915/http://blackhawk.artsalive.org/homewood.htm

References

Visitor centers
Viewing area